The Smuggler's Gulch is part of a steep walled canyon about  inland of the Pacific Ocean. The canyon crosses the Mexico–United States border, between Tijuana, Baja California, and San Diego, California, and Smuggler's Gulch is the part of the canyon on the US side of the border. Smuggling activities within Smuggler's Gulch have occurred since the 19th century, giving this part of the canyon its name.

The gulch is vegetated with coastal sage scrub and is home to threatened and special concern bird species. It has a seasonal stream, and normal flow is diverted for treatment. During the late 19th and early 20th centuries, agriculture occurred in the gulch, but was largely abandoned by the late 20th century. In the late 20th century, the gulch was used by illegal immigrants when crossing from Mexico into the United States, being described as a "prime route" during that period. Beginning in the 1980s, sewage flowing through the gulch entered into the Tijuana River, contributing to water contamination; since then mitigation efforts have been undertaken, but are defeated by rainfall. Since 2009, it has been partially filled and traversed by the Mexico–United States barrier.

Flora and fauna
The flora of the gulch consists of coastal sage scrub. In the early 20th century, golden-spined cereus (Bergerocactus emoryi), listed by the California Native Plant Society as a rare plant, existed within the gulch. In 2015, a small number of singlewhorl burrobrush (Ambrosia monogyra), also listed as a rare plant by the California Native Plant Society, were documented near the mouth of the gulch.

Near and in the gulch, a few threatened and special concern species have been observed. These include the coastal California gnatcatcher (Polioptila californica californica), Cooper’s Hawk (Accipter cooperii), and the northern harrier (Circus hudsonius). Over 350 avian species have been observed near and within the gulch.

Geography
 

In the mid-19th century, Smuggler's Gulch had marshland and ponds of water. The stream only flows seasonally during the winter months. When the base flow is absent, sewage from Mexico would follow the path of the creek were it not diverted for treatment. An alluvial fan has formed at the northern mouth of the gulch due to colluvium deposits. A natural spring had existed within the gulch. In the early 1990s, the stream was funneled into a  agricultural channel which flows into the Tijuana River. This channel is connected to the gulch via an earthen channel which ends at Monument Road.

History
Dating back thousands of years before the arrival of Europeans in the Americas, the Kumeyaay lived in the area in and around the gulch. Melijo, a Kumeyaay village, existed north of the gulch. In 1769, Junípero Serra described the village as a "gentile settlement, thickly populated". Some of its inhabitants took part in the 1775 attack on Mission San Diego de Alcalá. Some time after the attack during the 18th Century, the people of the village were displaced.

During the Mexican period, the gulch was part of Rancho Melijo. It was owned by Santiago Argüello, who used it to raise cattle and horses. Following the Mexican–American War, monuments were placed along the Mexico–United States border; monument 256 was placed near the gulch. The canyon began to be referred to as Smuggler's Gulch as far back as the 1880s due to smuggling of livestock from Mexico into the United States. Other items smuggled through the gulch were cigars and lace undergarments. In 1889, a schoolhouse was built near the mouth of the gulch and continued to operate until 1941; prior to its closing, it had been the southwest most school in the United States. , the former schoolhouse still exists as a private residence and had moved from its original location onto private property.

In the early 20th Century, prior to the American entry into World War II, about a dozen families settled within the gulch; they included the Satterlee, Welcome, Smallcomb, Brehlmeier, and Coones families, with most involved in agriculture. After World War II, mining occurred within the gulch. By the 1970s, significant croplands which had existed with the Tijuana River Valley began to be abandoned, with the exception of those near the mouths of the gulch and nearby Goat Canyon.Beginning in the 1970s, contaminated water began to flow through the gulch due to uncontrolled development that occurred as Tijuana began to grow into the gulch south of the border; farming within Smuggler's Gulch began to become unfeasible due to sewage contamination of the farmland. In the 1980s, tens of thousands of people illegally immigrating into the United States passed through the gulch and were subject to rape and robbery by criminals who targeted them; over the next decade, the gulch continued to be a common route for smuggling of illegal immigrants into the United States. National Geographic referred to the gulch as the "prime route" for illegal entry into the United States during the 1990s. At the height of its utilization for illegal entry into the United States, more than 10% of the 1.2 million apprehended illegal aliens were captured within the gulch.

Due to the sewage flowing through Smuggler's Gulch, Border Field State Park was quarantined. Beginning in the latter half of the 1980s, work began to collect sewage flows within the gulch but was insufficient to capture all of it, with over  continuing into the estuary every day in 1987. In the 1990s, the City of San Diego purchased land at the mouth of the gulch and utilized it as a toxic waste dump, importing contaminated soils from Sorrento Valley. By the mid-1990s, millions of gallons of sewage were flowing through the gulch, leading to additional attempts to mitigate the issue by construction of additional pumps and pipes to the then-newly constructed International Boundary Wastewater Treatment Plant; however, when it rains these pumps are insufficient to collect the polluted waters from Tijuana, which then flow into the Tijuana River and thence into the Pacific Ocean. As a result, the ocean adjacent to Imperial Beach is frequently closed to swimming because of bacterial contamination in the water.

Barrier construction

Construction of a border fence by the United States Border Patrol, made of corrugated landing strips, in the area of Smuggler's Gulch began in 1990, and was completed in 1993; this fence was not opposed by environmentalist, as it reduced trampling of habitat and egg consumption by illegal aliens. Due to this apprehension of illegal immigrants were significantly reduced, and shifted where illegal entry occurred to places without double fencing, including Smuggler's Gulch. In 2002, a Border Patrol agent died when her vehicle toppled down the gulch's steep slopes; this was one of four deaths that were attributed to narrow switchback roads which existed on the canyon walls. In February 2004, the California Coastal Commission halted construction of the Mexico–United States barrier, asking the United States federal government to make additional environmental concessions in regards to border barrier construction; this action was criticized in The American Spectator. Beginning in 2005, environmental laws were waived, as authorized by the Real ID Act, in order for the Mexico–United States barrier to be built in the gulch and in nearby Goat Canyon. These proposed actions were criticized by various people and organizations, including the Sierra Club. In 2005, 127,000 illegal aliens were apprehended in the area of Smuggler's Gulch, overcoming the existing fencing. In August 2008, barrier construction in the gulch began; work was contracted to Kiewit Corporation.

In July 2009, work was completed on the project in the gulch; it cost $58 million and utilized 72,000 dump truck loads to fill the  gulch. The  road, lighting, and triple barrier, topped the fill within Smuggler's Gulch. The filling of the gulch was one of the most expensive sections of the Mexico–United States barrier.

In 2010, irrigation was installed on the fill to encourage growth of vegetation to reduce erosion, which would assist in stabilizing the earthen fill. After the barrier was completed in the gulch the area has been described as "nearly impenetrable"; however, even with these alterations to the terrain, it has not stopped all smuggling. As recently as June 2019, a small number of people have continued to evade CBP agents within the gulch. Due to the decrease in people crossing the border in the gulch, sensitive areas in the Tijuana River Estuary are no longer trampled upon.

At the base of the filled portion of the gulch, underneath the border barrier, are two  culverts to allow water flow. Following the construction of the border barrier in the gulch, a water channel was created to allow water from the gulch to flow into the Tijuana River; this channel is dredged and excavated yearly to remove trash, debris, and sands, which clog the channel. These items that are removed, originating from Tijuana, are waste from various sources, including hospitals and home construction. Removed sediment is deposited in a former quarry located in the Tijuana River Valley.

, the gulch south of Monument Road and north of the Mexico–United States barrier is owned by the County of San Diego. The gulch between the Mexico–United States barrier, and the Mexico–United States border, are federal lands.

Notes

References

External links

Geography of San Diego
Landforms of Baja California
Landforms of San Diego County, California
Mexico–United States border
Geography of Tijuana